Cumnock RFC is a rugby union club based in East Ayrshire.

Cumnock Sevens

The club host the Cumnock Sevens tournament. The entrants play for the David Ansell Memorial Trophy.

Honours

BT West Regional Bowl winners, Finalist of BT National Bowl. BT West Div 3 Champions 14/15.
 Arran Sevens
 Champions: 1985, 1986

Notable former players

Scotland internationalists

The following former Cumnock players have represented Scotland at full international level.

Glasgow District
The following former Cumnock players have represented Glasgow District at provincial level.

Glasgow Warriors
The following former Cumnock players have represented Glasgow Warriors at provincial level.

References

Rugby clubs established in 1962
Scottish rugby union teams
1962 establishments in Scotland